A Midsummer Night's Party is a Swedish film which was released to cinemas in Sweden on 31 July 2009, directed by Staffan Lindberg.

Cast
 Peter Magnusson as Göran
 David Hellenius as Alex
 Mirja Turestedt as Grynet
 Moa Gammel as Linnea
 Alexandra Rapaport as Sofia
 Peter Dalle as Hans Kjällén
 Christine Meltzer as Elin
 Tanja Lorentzon as Anne
 Dan Ekborg as Greger Bengtzon
 Ruth Vega Fernandez as Mikaela
 Niklas Engdahl as Dodde
 Carl Stjernlöf as Niklas
 Lisbeth Johansson as a nurse

References

External links
 
 
 

Swedish comedy films
2009 films
2000s Swedish films